Vlastimil Brodský (15 December 1920 – 20 April 2002) was a Czech actor. He appeared in more than one hundred films, and is considered a key figure in the postwar development of Czech cinema.

One of his best-known roles was as the title character in Jakob der Lügner for which won the Silver Bear for Best Actor at the 25th Berlin International Film Festival. He also played the king in the hit children's TV series Arabela and as Alois Drchlík in The Visitors.

His final film role was as a pensioner named Frantisek in Autumn Spring. This role earned him his first and only Czech Lion (a prestigious film award), for best actor.

Personal life
He was married to Jana Brejchová for 16 years before getting a divorce; together they had a daughter, actress Tereza Brodská. Brodský also had a son, actor Marek Brodský. Brodský committed suicide on 20 April 2002.

Selected filmography

Film

Television

References

External links
 

1920 births
2002 suicides
20th-century Czech male actors
21st-century Czech male actors
Actors from Ostrava
Czech male film actors
Czech male stage actors
Czech male television actors
Recipients of Medal of Merit (Czech Republic)
Silver Bear for Best Actor winners
Suicides by firearm in the Czech Republic
Film people from Ostrava
2002 deaths
Czech Lion Awards winners
Czechoslovak male actors
Recipients of the Thalia Award